Martin Mander is an entrepreneur based out of Estonia with investments across Europe, Russia, and the Middle East.

In 2012, he was awarded Mr. Year Estonia pageant by Manhunt International. In 2018, he was named as the only level 8 marketer in Estonia by Lyoness.

References

1985 births
Living people
Estonian businesspeople